Hans Ritter von Adam (1886-1917) was a German First World War fighter ace credited with confirmed aerial victories over 20 enemy airplanes and an observation balloon.

The victory list

Hans Ritter von Adam's victories are reported in chronological order, which is not necessarily the order or dates the victories were confirmed by headquarters.

Abbreviations were expanded by the editor creating this list.

Footnote

References

Citations

Bibliography

 
 Guttman, Jon (2005). Balloon-Busting Aces of World War 1. Oxford UK, Osprey Publishing. .

German military-related lists
Adam, Hans Ritter von